John Howe (1556–1591), of South Ockenden, Essex, was an English Member of Parliament.

He was a Member (MP) of the Parliament of England for Yarmouth (Isle of Wight) in 1589, in the 7th Parliament of Queen Elizabeth I.

References

1556 births
1591 deaths
16th-century English people
People from Essex
People of the Tudor period
Members of the Parliament of England (pre-1707)